The Battle of Taipale was a series of battles fought during the Winter War between Finland and Soviet Union from 6 to 27 December 1939. The battles were part of a Soviet campaign to penetrate the Finnish Mannerheim Line in the Karelian Isthmus region to open a route into southern Finland. Despite their numerical superiority, the Soviet forces were unable to break through the Finnish defences.

Prelude: 30 November – 6 December 
On 30 November, Soviet forces crossed the Finnish border and bombarded civilian targets from the air. The Karelian Isthmus was split into two military sectors by both belligerents: one on the side of Lake Ladoga and the other on the side of the Gulf of Finland. In the Ladoga sector, the Soviet commanding officer was Vladimir Grendahl and on the Finnish side, Erik Heinrichs. On 3 December, Grendahl received orders to make a breakthrough in his sector, as the defenders in the other sector were more numerous and offered fiercer resistance. The former objective of reaching Viipuri on the Gulf side of the Karelian Isthmus became a secondary priority. The attack began on 6 December, when the Finns had retreated to the Mannerheim Line.

The battle: 6–27 December 
The Battle of Taipale began on 6 December, started when the Soviet 49th and 150th Rifle Divisions of the 7th Army tried to cross the Taipale River at three locations. The terrain was flat farmland, so the Soviets had no cover, and the Finnish 10th Division's accurate artillery inflicted heavy losses. However, due to the sheer size of the Soviet forces, the attackers managed to establish a bridgehead over the river. The Finns inflicted such severe casualties that some units (even as large as a regiment) had to be withdrawn. In the following days, the Finns repelled more assaults and inflicted even more casualties, causing the collapse of many Soviet units. Despite this, however, they were not strong enough to stop the Soviet advance, and soon the bridgehead was gradually enlarged, securing ground for the reinforcements that were on the way (the 39th Armoured Brigade). By 12 December, the bridgehead was large enough to support an advance into the Taipale sector.

Notes

References

Citations

Sources 

In English

 
 
 

Online sources
 

In Finnish
 
 
 
 

In Russian

 
 

Online sources

Further reading

External links 

Военный альбом (photographs of the Soviet–Finnish War 1939–1940)
JR28 War diaries (The digitized contemporary war diaries of the Finnish regiment that fought in the Taipale front 1939–1940. In Finnish.)

Taipale
1939 in Finland
1940 in Finland
December 1939 events